The 2019–20 season was Ferencvárosi TC's 117th competitive season, 11th consecutive season in the OTP Bank Liga and 120th year in existence as a football club.

First team squad

Transfers

Summer

In:

Out:

Source:

Winter

In:

Out:

Source:

Competitions

Overview

Nemzeti Bajnokság I

League table

Results summary

Results by round

Matches

Hungarian Cup

UEFA Champions League

First qualifying round

Second qualifying round

Third qualifying round

UEFA Europa League

Play-off round

Group stage

Statistics

Appearances and goals
Last updated on 27 June 2020.

|-
|colspan="14"|Youth players:
|-
|colspan="14"|Out to loan:

|-
|colspan="14"|Players no longer at the club:

|}

Top scorers
Includes all competitive matches. The list is sorted by shirt number when total goals are equal.
Last updated on 27 June 2020

Disciplinary record
Includes all competitive matches. Players with 1 card or more included only.

Last updated on 27 June 2020

Overall
{|class="wikitable"
|-
|Games played || 50 (33 OTP Bank Liga, 14 CL/EL and 3 Hungarian Cup)
|-
|Games won || 30 (23 OTP Bank Liga, 5 CL/EL and 2 Hungarian Cup)
|-
|Games drawn || 14 (7 OTP Bank Liga, 7 CL/EL and 0 Hungarian Cup)
|-
|Games lost || 6 (3 OTP Bank Liga, 2 CL/EL and 1 Hungarian Cup)
|-
|Goals scored || 83
|-
|Goals conceded || 46
|-
|Goal difference || +35
|-
|Yellow cards || 105
|-
|Red cards || 5
|-
|rowspan="1"|Worst discipline ||  Eldar Ćivić (5 , 3 )
|-
|rowspan="2"|Best result || 6–1 (A) v Debrecen - (Nemzeti Bajnokság I) - 10-11-2019
|-
| 5–0 (H) v Kaposvár - (Nemzeti Bajnokság I) - 14-3-2020
|-
|rowspan="1"|Worst result || 0–4 (H) v Dinamo Zagreb - (UEFA Champions League) - 13-08-2019
|-
|rowspan="3"|Most appearances ||  Ihor Kharatin (45 appearances)
|-
|  Tokmac Nguen (45 appearances)
|-
|  Miha Blažič (45 appearances)
|-
|rowspan="2"|Top scorer ||  Franck Boli (12 goals)
|-
|  Tokmac Nguen (12 goals)
|-
|Points || 103/150 (68.66%)
|-

Attendances

List of the home matches:

References

External links
 Official Website
 UEFA
 fixtures and results

2019-20
Hungarian football clubs 2019–20 season